East Turkistan Republic (ETR) may refer to:

 First East Turkestan Republic (1933–1934),  Islamic republic centered on the city of Kashgar
 Second East Turkestan Republic (1944–1946), Soviet-backed Turkic people's republic in northern Xinjiang

See also
 East Turkestan independence movement, in PRC-administered province of Xinjiang, popular among some Uyghur nationalists
 East Turkestan National Awakening Movement